Vidurio ir vakarų Lietuvos regionas is statistical area of the Nomenclature of Territorial Units for Statistics, level NUTS 2. It includes all counties of Lithuania except Vilnius County.

Economy 
The Gross domestic product (GDP) of the region was 31.9 billion € in 2021, accounting for 57% of Lithuanian economic output. GDP per capita was around 16,000 €.

References 

NUTS 2 statistical regions of the European Union